Emma of Normandy (referred to as Ælfgifu in royal documents; c. 984 – 6 March 1052) was a Norman-born noblewoman who became the English, Danish, and Norwegian queen through her marriages to the Anglo-Saxon king Æthelred the Unready and the Danish king Cnut the Great. The daughter of the Norman ruler Richard the Fearless and Gunnor, she was Queen of the English during her marriage to King Æthelred from 1002 to 1016, except during a brief interruption in 1013–14 when the Danish king Sweyn Forkbeard occupied the English throne. Æthelred died in 1016, and Emma remarried to Sweyn's son Cnut. As Cnut's wife, she was Queen of England from their marriage in 1017, Queen of Denmark from 1018, and Queen of Norway from 1028 until Cnut died in 1035.

After her husbands' deaths, Emma remained in the public eye and continued to participate actively in politics during the reigns of her sons by each husband, Edward the Confessor and Harthacnut. In 1035, when her second husband Cnut died and was succeeded by their son Harthacnut, who was in Denmark at the time, Emma was designated to act as his regent until his return, which she did in rivalry with Harold Harefoot. Emma is the central figure within the Encomium Emmae Reginae, a critical source for the history of early-11th-century English politics. As Catherine Karkov notes, Emma is one of the most visually represented early medieval queens.

Marriage to Æthelred II 
In an attempt to pacify Normandy, King Æthelred of England married Emma in 1002. Similarly Richard II, Duke of Normandy hoped to improve relations with the English in wake of recent conflict and a failed kidnapping attempt against him by Æthelred. Viking raids on England were often based in Normandy in the late 10th century, and for Æthelred this marriage was intended to unite against the Viking threat. Upon their marriage, Emma was given the Anglo-Saxon name of Ælfgifu, which was used for formal and official matters, and became Queen of England. She received properties of her own in Winchester, Rutland, Devonshire, Suffolk and Oxfordshire, as well as the city of Exeter.

Æthelred and Emma had two sons, Edward the Confessor and Alfred Ætheling, and a daughter, Goda of England (or Godgifu).

When King Sweyn Forkbeard of Denmark invaded and conquered England in 1013, Emma and her children were sent to Normandy, where Æthelred joined soon after. They returned to England after Sweyn's death in 1014.

Emma and Æthelred's marriage ended with Æthelred's death in London in 1016. Æthelred's oldest son from his first marriage, Æthelstan, had been heir apparent until his death in June 1014. Emma's sons had been ranked after all of the sons from Æthelred's first wife, the eldest surviving of whom was Edmund Ironside. Emma made an attempt to get her older son, Edward, recognised as heir. Although this movement was supported by Æthelred's chief advisor, Eadric Streona, it was opposed by Edmund Ironside, Æthelred's third-oldest son, and his allies, who eventually revolted against his father.

In 1015, Cnut, the son of Sweyn Forkbeard, invaded England. He was held out of London until the deaths of Æthelred and Edmund in April and November 1016, respectively. Queen Emma attempted to maintain Anglo-Saxon control of London until her marriage to Cnut was arranged. Some scholars believe that the marriage saved her sons' lives, as Cnut tried to rid himself of rival claimants, but spared their lives.

Marriage to Cnut 

Cnut gained control of most of England after he defeated Edmund Ironside on 18 October 1016, at the Battle of Assandun, after which they agreed to divide the kingdom, Edmund taking Wessex and Cnut the rest of the country. Edmund died shortly afterwards on 30 November, and Cnut became the king of all England. At the time of their marriage in 1017, Emma's sons from her marriage to Æthelred were sent to live in Normandy under the tutelage of her brother. At this time Emma became Queen of England, and later of Denmark and Norway.

The Encomium Emmae Reginae suggests in its second book that Emma and Cnut's marriage, though begun as a political strategy, became an affectionate marriage.
During their marriage, Emma and Cnut had a son, Harthacnut, and a daughter, Gunhilda.

Issue
During her two marriages Emma had 5 children:
 Edward the Confessor c. 1003 – 5 January 1066, died without issue
 Goda of England c.1004 – c.1049
 Alfred the Noble c. 1005–1036
 Harthacnut
 Gunhilda of Denmark

Conspiracy regarding the death of Alfred

In 1036, Alfred Aetheling and Edward the Confessor, Emma's sons by Æthelred, returned to England from their exile in Normandy in order to visit their mother. During their time in England they were supposed to be protected by Harthacnut. However, Harthacnut was involved with his kingdom in Denmark. Alfred was captured and blinded by holding a hot iron to his eyes. He later died from his wounds.

Edward escaped the attack, and returned to Normandy. He returned after his place on the throne had been secured.

Encomium Emmae Reginae places the blame of Alfred's capture, torture and murder completely on Harold Harefoot, thinking he intended to rid himself of two more potential claimants to the English throne by killing Edward and Alfred. Some scholars make the argument that it could have been Godwin, Earl of Wessex, who was traveling with Alfred and Edward as their protector in passage.

Harthacnut's reign
Harthacnut, Emma and Cnut's son, assembled a fleet to invade England in 1039, and when Harold died in March 1040 he was invited to became king. He crossed to England with his fleet and Emma. He was criticised by the Anglo-Saxon Chronicle for his heavy taxation to pay for the fleet and for having Harold's body disinterred and thrown into a ditch. In 1041 he invited his half-brother Edward the Confessor to England. The Encomium says that Edward was sworn in as king, which probably means that he was recognised as heir as Harthacnut knew that he did not have long to live. He may have been persuaded to make the invitation by Emma, who would have been keen to preserve her position by ensuring that England was still ruled by a son of hers.

Edward's reign

After Harthacnut's death in June 1042, Edward the Confessor succeeded to the throne and was crowned in April 1043. During the same year, Edward rode to Winchester along with 
Earls Leofric, Godwin, and Siward, accused Emma of treason, and deprived her of her lands and titles. However, Edward soon relented, and Emma's lands and titles were restored.

Death and burial 

After her death in 1052, Emma was interred alongside Cnut and Harthacnut in the Old Minster, Winchester, before being transferred to the new cathedral built after the Norman Conquest. During the English Civil War (1642–1651), their remains were disinterred and scattered about the Cathedral floor by parliamentary forces.

Queenship
As Pauline Stafford noted, Emma is the "first of the early medieval queens" to be depicted through contemporary portraiture. To that end, Emma is the central figure within the Encomium Emmae Reginae (incorrectly titled Gesta Cnutonis Regis during the later Middle Ages) a critical source for the study of English succession in the 11th century. During the reign of Æthelred, Emma most likely served as little more than a figurehead a physical embodiment of the treaty between the English and her Norman father. However, her influence increased considerably under Cnut. Until 1043, writes Stafford, Emma "was the richest woman in England ... and held extensive lands in the East Midlands and Wessex." Emma's authority was not simply tied to landholdings—which fluctuated greatly from 1036 to 1043—she also wielded significant sway over the ecclesiastical offices of England.

The Encomium Emmæ Reginae or Gesta Cnutonis Regis

The Encomium is divided into three parts, the first of which deals with Sweyn Forkbeard and his conquest of England. The second focuses on Cnut and relates the defeat of "Princes" Æthelred (never named) and Edmund, Cnut's marriage to Emma (again, without mentioning she had been the wife of Æthelred), and Cnut's kingship. The third address the events after Cnut's death; Emma's involvement in the seizing of the royal treasury, and the treachery of Earl Godwin. It begins by addressing Emma, "May our Lord Jesus Christ preserve you, O Queen, who excel all those of your sex in the amiability of your way of life." Emma is "the most distinguished woman of her time for delightful beauty and wisdom."

Scholarly debate
This flattery, writes Elizabeth M. Tyler, is "part of a deliberate attempt to intervene, on Emma's behalf, in the politics of the Anglo-Danish court," a connotation which an 11th-century audience would have understood. This proves to be a direct contrast to earlier evaluations of the text, such as the introduction to the 1998 reprint of Alistair Campbell's 1949 edition in which Simon Keynes remarks: 

Felice Lifshitz, in her seminal study of the Encomium comments:

Manuscripts
Prior to May 2008 only one copy of the Encomium was believed to exist. However, a late-14th-century manuscript, the Courtenay Compendium, was discovered in the Devon Record Office, where it had languished since the 1960s. According to a report by the UK Arts Council, "The most significant item [within the text] for British history is the Encomium Emma Reginae ... It is highly probable that the present manuscript represents the most complete witness to the revised version of the Encomium". The manuscript was put up for auction in December 2008, and purchased for £600,000 (5.2 million Danish kroner) on behalf of the Royal Library, Denmark. Unlike the Liber Vitae, the compendium does not contain any images of Emma.
The [[New Minster Liber Vitae|New Minster Liber Vitae]], currently housed in the British Library, was completed in 1030, shortly before Cnut's death in 1035. The frontispiece depicts "King Cnut and Queen Emma presenting a cross to the altar of New Minster, Winchester." Stafford in her visual exegesis of the portrait states, "it is not clear whether we should read it as a representation of a powerful woman or a powerless one." In one portrait, each facet of Emma's role as sovereign is displayed; that of a dutiful wife and influential queen.

It has been suggested that the poem Semiramis, possibly written in 1017 by Warner of Rouen at the court of Emma's brother, Richard, Duke of Normandy, and dedicated to her brother, Archbishop Robert, is a contemporary satire ridiculing Emma's relation with Cnut.

Emma is also depicted in a number of later medieval texts, such as the 13th-century Life of Edward the Confessor (Cambridge University Library MS. Ee.3.59) and a 14th-century roll Genealogy of the English Kings, Genealogical Chronicle of the English Kings.Emma and her sons Edward and Alfred are characters in the anonymous Elizabethan play Edmund Ironside, sometimes considered an early work by William Shakespeare.

The Ordeal of Queen Emma
 The Ordeal of Queen Emma by Fire at Winchester is a legend that seems to have originated in the 13th century. Queen Emma was accused of unchastity with Bishop Ælfwine of Winchester. In order to prove her innocence, she was obliged to undergo the ordeal of walking over nine red-hot ploughshares placed on the pavement of the nave of Winchester Cathedral. Two bishops conducted the barefoot queen to the line of red-hot ploughshares. She walked over the red-hot ploughshares, but, having sought the protection of St Swithun, whose shrine is at Winchester, felt neither the naked iron nor the fire. William Blake did an illustration of the event.

 Family tree 

 References 
Citations

Sources

 
 
 

 
 

 

 

 

 

Further reading

 Gameson, Richard. L’Angleterre et La Flandre Aux Xe et XIe Siècles : Le Témoignage Des Manuscrits. Actes des congrès de la Société des historiens médiévistes de l’enseignement supérieur public 32.1 (2001): 165–206.
 Howard, Ian, (2005) Harold II: a Throne-Worthy King. Essay included in King Harold II and the Bayeux Tapestry, pages 35–52. Boydell Press: 
 Monk of St Omer (1949) Encomium Emmae Reginae; ed. Alistair Campbell. (Camden 3rd series; no. 72.) London: Royal Historical Society (Reissued by Cambridge U. P. 1998 with suppl. introd. by Simon Keynes )
 Patterson, Robert. The Haskins Society Journal Studies in Medieval History Continuum, 2003. Print.
See also Encomium Emmae (for the Encomium Emmae Reginae or Gesta Cnutonis Regis'' in honour of Queen Emma)

External links

 

 
 

 
 

 
 

 
 

 
 

980s births
1052 deaths
11th-century Danish people
11th-century Danish women
11th-century English people
11th-century English women
11th-century Norman women
11th-century Normans
11th-century Norwegian people
11th-century Norwegian women
11th-century women rulers
Anglo-Saxon royal consorts
Burials at Winchester Cathedral
Cnut the Great
Danish royal consorts
English royal consorts
House of Knýtlinga
House of Normandy
House of Wessex
Norman women
Norwegian royal consorts
Queen mothers
Remarried royal consorts
Year of birth uncertain